Ian Robinson is a former professional rugby league footballer who played in the 1970s and 1980s.

Playing career

East Hull-born Ian Robinson was a product of Rovers Colts, and signed professional forms for the Robins in June 1974.

Robinson made his Rovers first team debut as a substitute for Glyn Turner in a 25-10 home win in a First Division game at home to Swinton on 12 October 1975. He was then selected at left-centre alongside the great Clive Sullivan for the following week’s 11-10 home win over Bradford Northern. Regular No 4 Bernard Watson returned to the side the week afterwards, and Robinson next got an opportunity in a home win over Castleford in January that season. He then appeared regularly at centre for the remainder of the season, scoring his first try in a 21-12 Challenge Cup win over Whitehaven on 15 February.

With David Hall, Mike Smith and Watson monopolising the centre positions, Robinson’s opportunities were very limited during the following two seasons, but in the Championship-winning campaign of 1978/79, he was selected at full-back for the first time at home to Wakefield Trinity on 6 March. He played in that position in eight of the last nine games of the season, which included the crucial 15-8 win at championship-rivals Widnes. In that game, he put in an outstanding performance in both attack and defence, denying a certain try for the home side and scoring himself to put Rovers ahead in the first half. Back at centre for the start of the 1979/80 season, he was injured in the first game and made only irregular appearances in the second half of the season, missing out on a place in the 15 for the 1980 Wembley final.

After having to be content with a place on the substitutes bench at the start of the 1980/81 season, Robinson got his chance at full-back in a 25-10 home derby win in late September, and he was the regular occupant of the No 1 jersey for most of the rest of the season, scoring his one and only hat-trick for the first team in a 34-16 in John Player trophy win at Keighley. An injury in the penultimate league game then cost him the chance of Challenge Cup and Premiership final appearances.

The signing of George Fairbairn for the 1981/82 season put paid to Robinson’s chances of a regular full-back spot. After making only occasional appearances in the first half of that season, he was selected at left-centre after a 24-8 defeat at Leeds on the last day of January, and retained his place for the most of the remainder of the season. He started 1982/83 at centre too, and after covering for the injured Fairbairn in three early games, he returned at left centre at the beginning of October, remaining there until injury caused him to miss the penultimate game.

In the championship-winning season of 1983/84, although Robinson was at centre for the first four games, Mike Smith and Gary Prohm were the first choice centres, and he made only a handful of appearances. He did, however, get a winner’s medal in the 1984 Premiership Final against Castleford, coming on as a late substitute for John Millington. With John Dorahy not returning to the club in 1984/85, Smith was moved to off-half and Robinson started 40 out 46 games in the right-centre position. He earned two more winner’s medals, as Rovers retained the Championship, and beat Hull FC 12-0 in the John Player final. Robinson started the 1985/86 season at centre, but a combination of injury and kidney trouble restricted his appearances, and he played his last game for the club in a 12-8 defeat at Wigan on 19 January 1986.

In all, Ian Robinson made 219 appearances for the Robins, with 184 starts and 35 appearances from the bench. He scored exactly 50 tries for the club and, as an occasional goal-kicker, he kicked 40 goals for a total of 215 points. At 5’11’ and 14st he was a sturdy and powerful performer at both full-back and centre – a reliable, no-frills player who was unfortunate to play in at a time when the competition for places in the back division was fierce. In another era he could easily have topped the 300 appearance mark.

https://www.hullkr.co.uk/200-club-no-10-ian-robinson/

Rugby League Championship

Ian Robinson played in Hull Kingston Rovers Championship winning teams of the 1978–79 season, 1983–84 season and 1984–85 season

Premiership Final Appearances

Ian Robinson played as an interchange/substitute in Hull Kingston Rovers' 18-10 victory over Castleford Tigers in the Final of the 1983-84 Rugby League Premiership during the 1983–84 season

Ian Robinson played right-, i.e. number 3, in Hull Kingston Rovers' 36-16 defeat against St.Helens in the Final of the 1984-85 Rugby League Premiership during the 1984-85 season

County Cup Final appearances

Ian Robinson played  in Hull Kingston Rovers' 7-8 defeat by Leeds in the 1980–81 Yorkshire County Cup Final during the 1980–81 season at Fartown Ground, Huddersfield on Saturday 8 November 1980.

Ian Robinson played right-, i.e. number 3, and scored a try in the 12-29 defeat by Hull F.C. in the 1984–85 Yorkshire County Cup Final during the 1984–85 season at Boothferry Park, Kingston upon Hull on Saturday 27 October 1984.

BBC2 Floodlit Trophy Final appearances
Ian Robinson played  in Hull Kingston Rovers' 3-13 defeat by Hull F.C. in the 1979 BBC2 Floodlit Trophy Final during the 1979–80 season at The Boulevard, Kingston upon Hull on Tuesday 18 December 1979.

John Player Special Trophy Final appearances

Ian Robinson played right-, i.e. number 3, in Hull Kingston Rovers' 12-0 victory over Hull F.C. in the 1984–85 John Player Special Trophy Final during the 1984–85 season at Boothferry Park, Kingston upon Hull on Saturday 26 January 1985.

Ian Robinson played as an interchange/substitute, i.e. number 14, (replacing  Peter Johnston on 74-minutes) in the 8-11 defeat by Wigan in the 1985–86 John Player Special Trophy Final during the 1985–86 season at Elland Road, Leeds on Saturday 11 January 1986.

Testimonial match
Ian Robinson's Testimonial match at Hull Kingston Rovers took place in 1984.

References

Living people
English rugby league players
Hull Kingston Rovers players
Place of birth missing (living people)
Rugby league centres
Rugby league fullbacks
Rugby league players from Kingston upon Hull
Year of birth missing (living people)